Come, Together is a South Korean drama film directed by Shin Dong-il and released May 2017.

Plot
An outlook on an ordinary Korean family contending with societal pressures in everyday life.

Cast
 Lee Hye-eun as Mi-young
 Im Hyeon-gook as Beom-gu
 Chae Bin as Han-na
 Han Sung-yun as Ah-yeong
 Moon Jeong-soo
 Kim Jae-rok
 Lee Bom as Slender woman
 Han Kyeong-hyeon
 Bae Jeong-hwa as Eun-jeong

References

External links

2016 films
South Korean drama films
2010s South Korean films